is a Japanese Olympic weightlifter. He represented his country at the 2016 Summer Olympics.

References 

1992 births
Living people
Japanese male weightlifters
Weightlifters at the 2016 Summer Olympics
Weightlifters at the 2018 Asian Games
Olympic weightlifters of Japan
Asian Games competitors for Japan
21st-century Japanese people